The I2U2 Group is a grouping of India, Israel, the United Arab Emirates, and the United States. The group's first joint statement, released on July 14, 2022, states that the countries aim to cooperate on "joint investments and new initiatives in water, energy, transportation, space, health, and food security."

Background 
In an essay for the Middle East Institute, Mohammed Soliman, a foreign policy thinker, made the strategic case for a broader "Indo-Abrahamic Alliance" that includes India, Israel, the UAE, and the United States and would expand in the future to include Egypt and Saudi Arabia to create a favorable balance of power that maintains peace and security in West Asia. Indian commentator Raja Mohan endorsed Soliman's Indo-Abrahamic concept and how it "can provide a huge fillip to India’s engagement with the extended neighbourhood to the west." Soliman's strategic concept of the "Indo-Abrahamic Alliance" is hailed as the one of the most influential articulations of post-US Middle East and eventually laid the framework for the I2U2 group. 

India, Israel, the UAE, and the United States held their first joint meeting virtually in October 2021. At the time, the grouping of the four countries was compared to the Quad. The inclusion of the UAE and Israel in a cooperative agreement of this kind was made possible by the Abraham Accords brokered in August 2020, which normalized relations between the two countries. Soliman intended for the Indo-Abrahamic Alliance concept to transform West Asia's regional geopolitics and geo-economics and ultimately link the I2U2 Plus group with the Quad to shore up an overarching Asian order. Soliman advocates for expanding the format to include more member states such as Egypt, Saudi Arabia, France, and Greece.

Indian commentator Harshil Mehta, writing for News18, called the I2U2 as "a platform for the 21st century, driven by economic pragmatism, multilateral cooperation, and strategic autonomy", which "stands in sharp contrast to old groupings where religion or political ideology would matter."

Collaborative projects 
The group held its inaugural summit on July 14, 2022, in which Indian Prime Minister Narendra Modi, US President Joe Biden, Israeli Prime Minister Yair Lapid, and UAE President Mohammed bin Zayed Al Nahyan participated. As an outcome of the summit, the leaders announced that the UAE will invest $2 billion "to develop a series of integrated food parks across India," while the group also agreed to proceed with "a hybrid renewable energy project in India's Gujarat State consisting of 300 megawatts (MW) of wind and solar capacity complemented by a battery energy storage system." Due to the actual needs of all parties, the I2U2's main cooperation focuses on economic growth and trade synergies, unlike the Quad based on defence and security.

I2U2 Plus

Egypt 
Raja Mohan argued for the inclusion of Egypt in the Indo-Abrahamic framework because of its location "at the cusp of the Mediterranean – Europe, Africa, and Asia, Egypt is the center and heart of the Greater Middle East." Soliman concurred with Mohan on the strategic need to bring Egypt into the Indo-Abrahamic framework/I2U2 group because of Cairo's civilizational outlook, demographics, geography, economic and military power, and geopolitical aspiration.

Saudi Arabia 
Soliman argued that the inclusion of Saudi Arabia under the Indo-Abrahamic framework/I2U2 is "critical to the development of a West Asian system that ensures long-term peace and stability."

References 

Intergovernmental  organizations
Organizations established in 2021
International economic organizations
India–Israel relations
India–United Arab Emirates relations
India–United States relations